This is a list of notable Javanese people.

Academics 
 Ki Hajar Dewantara, pioneer of education in Indonesia.
 Winai Dahlan, director of Halal Science Center, Chulalongkorn University
 Poerbatjaraka, specialist in Javanese literature
 Selo Soemardjan, sociologist
 Siti Fadilah, Indonesian cardiology research specialist and former Minister of Health of Indonesia
 Soedarsono Hadisapoetro, agriculture scientist

Activists 
 Jack van Tongeren, A white supremacist and racist, former leader of Australian neo-Nazi group "Australian Nationalist Movement" (Javanese father and Australian mother)
 Kartini, Indonesian national hero, pioneer of Javanese women rights
 Munir Said Thalib, human rights activist (also of Arab descent)

Art 
 Affandi, expressionistic painter
 Basuki Abdullah, Indonesian realist and naturalist painter
 Guruh Sukarnoputra, choreographer
 Iwan Tirta, Indonesian batik designer
 Soeki Irodikromo, Surinamese painter
 Reinier Asmoredjo, Surinamese painter
 Marina Joesoef, Indonesian painter and photographer (Javanese father)
 Raden Saleh, aristocratic painter in the 19th century

Authors
 Ayu Utami, author, known for the novel Saman
 George Junus Aditjondro, Indonesian sociologist
 Koentjaraningrat, Indonesian anthropologist
 Mpu Prapanca, Buddhist monk and poet, author of the Nagarakretagama
 Pramoedya Ananta Toer, author, known for the novel  Bumi Manusia
 Sapardi Djoko Damono, poet
 Subagio Sastrowardoyo, poet, essayist and literary critic
 Willibrordus S. Rendra, dramatist and poet
 Ronggowarsito, poet from the court of Kraton Surakarta

Business 
 Dahlan Iskan, owner of Jawa Pos Group and President Director of PLN Indonesia
 Setiawan Djody, owner of Setdco group
 Tommy Suharto, founder of Humpuss group

Cinema 
 Garin Nugroho, film director
 Febian Nurrahman Saktinegara, film director
 Rudy Soedjarwo, film director

Classical figures 
 Gajah Mada, Majapahitan prime minister who became famous with his palapa oath
 Airlangga, founder of the Kahuripan kingdom
 Hayam Wuruk, king from Rajasa Dynasty and the fourth monarch of Majapahit during the empire's golden age
 Joko Tingkir, founder and first king of the Sultanate of Pajang
 Jayabaya, king and prophet in ancient Kediri kingdom
 Ken Arok, founder of Rajasa Dynasty whose descendants became the ruling house of Singhasari Kingdom and Majapahit empire
 Ken Dedes, wife of Ken Arok
 Raden Wijaya, king from Rajasa Dynasty and the first monarch of Majapahit
 Rakai Pikatan, king of Sanjaya Dynasty in the 9th century AD, builder of Prambanan Hindu temple in Central Java
Samaratungga, king of Sailendra Dynasty, builder of the Borobudur Buddhist temple in Central Java

Comedians
 Basuki
 Benyamin Sueb
 Indra Birowo
 Jojon
 Tukul Arwana

Economics
 Airlangga Hartanto, 28th Ministry Industry of Indonesia 
 Bambang Soesatyo, 17th Speaker of People's Representative Council
 Boediono, former governor Bank of Indonesia and 11th Vice President of Indonesia
 Joko Widodo, 7th President of Indonesia
 Radius Prawiro, former governor Bank of Indonesia
 Subroto, economist and part of the Berkeley Mafia
 Setya Novanto, 16th Speaker of People's Representative Council
 Susi Pudjiastuti, 1st CEO Susi Air
 Sri Mulyani Indrawati, Indonesian minister and Managing Director of the World Bank Group
 Widjojo Nitisastro, Indonesian minister

Entertainment
 Adipati Dolken, Indonesian actor and model (also of German descent)
 Adinia Wirasti, Indonesian actress and model
Adjie Massaid, Indonesian actor, model, and politician
 Amara, prominent Indonesian singer, model, actress and practitioner of Muay Thai
 Anjasmara, Indonesian actor and yogist
Ario Bayu, Indonesian actor and model
 Aziz Sattar, Singaporean and Malaysian actor, comedian, singer, and director
 Basuki, Indonesian comedian
Benyamin Sueb, Indonesian comedian, actor, and singer (Javanese father)
Christian Sugiono, Indonesian actor and model (also of Chinese, German descent)
 Dian Sastrowardoyo, Indonesian model and actress
 Didi Petet, Indonesian actor
Dwi Sasono, Indonesian actor
 Kasma Booty, Malaysian actress and film star
 Luna Maya Sugeng, model, actress, singer and presenter (also of Austrian descent)
 Mariana Renata (half-Indonesian), model
 Maria Selena, Indonesian actress
 Mark-Paul Gosselaar, actor (Javanese mother)
Maudy Ayunda, Indonesian actress, model, activist, singer, and writer
 Nadine Alexandra (half-Indonesian), actress
 Nadine Chandrawinata (half-Indonesian), actress and model
 Nicholas Saputra, Indonesian actor (half Javanese-half German)
Pandji Pragiwaksono, Indonesian stand-up comedian
Pradikta Wicaksono, Indonesian singer and actor
 Pierre Coffin, French director and animator (Javanese mother)
RIo Dewanto, Indonesian actor and model
 Roy Marten (half-Indonesian), Indonesian actor, model and producer
 Sheila Majid, Malaysian singer
 Tio Pakusadewo, prominent Indonesian actor
 Tora Sudiro, Indonesian actor
 Tukul Arwana, Indonesian comedian and late night talk show host
 Widyawati, Indonesian actress
 Yoshi Sudarso, Indonesian actor
Yuki Kato, Indonesian actress, model, and television presenter (half Javanese-half Japanese)

Journalism
 Aiman Witjaksono, Indonesian journalist, news anchor, and interviewer 
Bambang Harymurti, editor-in-chief of Tempo 
 Goenawan Mohamad, founder of Tempo

Military
 Ahmad Yani, Indonesian Revolutionary Hero
 Bambang Darmono, Indonesian major general
 Bambang Soegeng, Indonesian independence hero
 Bambang Hendarso Danuri, chief of the Indonesian National Police
 Djatikoesoemo, Indonesian independence hero
 Djoko Suyanto, former commander of the Indonesian army
 Endriartono Sutarto, former commander of the Indonesian army
 Gatot Soebroto, Indonesian independence hero
 Katamso, Indonesian revolutionary hero
 Kyai Ronggo Ngabehi Soero Pernollo, Chinese-Javanese police chief, bureaucrat and founder of the Muslim branch of the Han family of Lasem
 Leonardus Benjamin Moerdani, former commander of Indonesian army
 M. T. Haryono, Indonesian revolutionary hero
 Omar Dhani, former Indonesian chief of the Air Staff
 Sarwo Edhie Wibowo, Indonesian general
 S. Parman, Indonesian revolutionary hero
 Soeprapto, Indonesian revolutionary hero
 Sudirman, Indonesian general during war of independence
 Suharto, Indonesian Army, President of Indonesia
 Supriyadi, appointed in absentia as Indonesia's first Minister of Defense, but never came forward
 Sutanto, former chief of Indonesian Police and the third head of Indonesian intelligence
 Sutomo, Indonesian military leader during the Indonesian National Revolution against the Netherlands
 Sutoyo Siswomiharjo, Indonesian revolutionary hero
 Untung Syamsuri,  leader of the 30 September Movement
 Widodo Adi Sutjipto, former commander of Indonesian army
 Wiranto, former commander of the Indonesian military

Music
 Ahmad Dhani, Indonesian rock singer and songwriter (also of Ashkenazi Jewish descent)
Anang Hermansyah, singer
 Anggun Cipta Sasmi, Indonesian and French singer
Ardhito Pramono, singer
Ari Lasso, singer, musical artist
 Azmyl Yunor, Malaysian singer-songwriter
Didi Kempot, singer-songwriter
 Ebiet G. Ade, singer and songwriter
 Eddie Van Halen and Alex Van Halen, American rock band Van Halen, Javanese mother
 Gesang Martohartono, composer of the song "Bengawan Solo"
Gombloh, singer and inger-songwriter
 Ian Antono, guitarist and songwriter
 Inul Daratista, dangdut singer
Isyana Sarasvati, singer-songwriter
 Iwan Fals, folk singer-songwriter
 Krisdayanti, popular singer
 Maissy (Pramaisshela Arinda Daryono Putri), child singer
 Mawi, Malaysian singer
 Michelle Branch, American singer (one Javanese grandparent)
 Nafa Urbach, actress and singer
 Ning Baizura, Malaysian pop singer
 K.P.H Notoprojo, composer
 Rini Wulandari, singer
 Siti Nurhaliza, Malaysian singer and actress (Javanese-Malays).
 Slamet Abdul Sjukur, composer
Soimah, singer, comedian, pesindhen, and entertainer
Tiara Andini, singer
Titiek Puspa, musician
 Raden Ajeng Srimulat, Keroncong singer and comedian popular in the 1940s-1960s
 Sudirman Arshad, a popular Malaysian singer in the 1980s
 Urip Achmad Ariyanto, singer
Via Vallen, dangdut koplo singer
Vidi Aldiano, singer
 W.R Supratman, composer of "Indonesia Raya", the national anthem of Indonesia
 Yuni Shara, pop singer

Politics
 Abdurrahman Wahid, Muslim intellectual and former Indonesian president (also of Chinese and Arab descent)
 Agung Laksono, Indonesian minister of peoples welfare
 Ahmad Zahid Hamidi, Current President of UMNO
 Ali Sastroamidjojo, former Prime Minister of Indonesia
 Amien Rais, leader of Indonesia's Constitutional Assembly (MPR), 1999-2004
 Anas Urbaningrum, the chairman of the Democratic Party
 Anton Apriantono, Indonesian minister
 B. J. Habibie, scientist and former Indonesian president (also of Bugis descent)
 Budiman Sudjatmiko, Indonesian parliament member
 Ernest Douwes Dekker, Indonesian freedom fighter, one of the founder of Indische Partij (also of Dutch and German descent)
Ganjar Pranowo, Indonesian politician, current Governor of Central Java
Gibran Rakabuming Raka, current Mayor of Surakarta, son of Joko Widodo
 Hidayat Nur Wahid, leader of Indonesia's Constitutional Assembly (MPR)
 Joko Widodo, current Indonesian president, former Governor of Jakarta and Mayor of Surakarta
 Megawati Soekarnoputri, former Indonesian president, daughter of Sukarno
 Mohamed Khir bin Toyo, ex-Chief Minister of Selangor, Malaysia
 Mohamed Rahmat, former Information Minister of Malaysia
 Musso, leader of the Communist Party of Indonesia
 Nur Jazlan Mohamed, Malaysian politician and member of the Parliament of Malaysia
 Sjam Kamaruzaman, key member of the Communist Party of Indonesia
 Paul Somohardjo, Surinamese politician
 Willy Soemita, Surinamese politician
 Prabowo Subianto, Chief of the Gerindra party
 Retno Marsudi, Minister of Foreign Affairs of the Republic of Indonesia
 Ruslan Abdulgani, former Indonesian vice prime minister
 Sutiyoso, former Governor of Jakarta
 Soenario, former Indonesian foreign minister and ambassador
 Sri Sultan Hamengkubuwono IX, former Indonesian vice-president, former Sultan of Yogyakarta, former Governor of Special Region of Yogyakarta
Sri Sultan Hamengkubuwono X, current Sultan of Yogyakarta, current Governor of Special Region of Yogyakarta
 Sudharmono, former Indonesian vice-president
 Suharto, former Indonesian president
 Sukarno, one of Indonesia's founding fathers and former president
 Susilo Bambang Yudhoyono, former Indonesian president
 Tjipto Mangoenkoesoemo, Indonesian independence hero, one of the founders of the Indische Partij
 Tjokroaminoto, first leader of Sarekat Dagang Islam
Tri Rismaharini, Indonesian politician, former Mayor of Surabaya (first woman mayor of surabaya), current Indonesian Minister of Social Affairs
 Try Sutrisno, former Indonesian vice-president
 Wahid Hasyim, first Indonesian Minister of Religious Affairs, father of Abdurrahman Wahid
 Wilopo, former Prime Minister of Indonesia
 Yenny Wahid, Indonesian Islamic activist and politician, daughter of Abdurrahman Wahid

Religion 
 Abdurrahman Wahid, chairman of Nahdlatul Ulama, President of Indonesia
 Ahmad Dahlan, Indonesian Islamic revivalist who established Muhammadiyah in 1912
 Albertus Soegijapranata, first Indonesian native bishop
 Emha Ainun Nadjib, prominent Indonesian Muslim intellectual
 Hasyim Asy'ari, founder of Nahdlatul Ulama
 Hasyim Muzadi, chairman of Nahdlatul Ulama, indonesian politician
 Ibrahim Tunggul Wulung, Protestant evangelist
 Ignatius Suharyo, Roman Catholic archbishop of Archdiocese of Jakarta
 Julius Darmaatmadja, Indonesian Cardinal of the Roman Catholic church
 Justinus Darmojuwono, first Indonesian Cardinal of the Roman Catholic church
 Kyai Sadrach, prominent Protestant evangelist and influential leader
 Muammar Z.A., Indonesian Quran reciter
 Nurcholish Madjid, prominent Indonesian Muslim intellectual
 Parwati Soepangat, Indonesian Buddhist figure who established Wanita Buddhis Indonesia (WBI) in 1973 and became the first chairman of WBI.
 Wahid Hasyim, chairman of Nahdlatul Ulama and Indonesian minister
 Muhammad Subuh Sumohadiwidjojo, founder of new religious movement Subud

Science 
 Pratiwi Sudarmono, scientist and former astronaut candidate
 Samaun Samadikun, engineer and educator
 Y. B. Mangunwijaya, Indonesian architect, writer, and Catholic religious leader

Sports 
 Ananda Mikola, Indonesian race car driver
 Andik Vermansyah, Indonesian soccer player
 Bambang Pamungkas, Indonesian soccer player
 Bima Sakti, Indonesian soccer player
 Budi Sudarsono, Indonesian soccer player
 Bambang Suprianto, Indonesian badminton player
 Bruce Diporedjo
 Citra Febrianti, Indonesian weightlifter
 Eko Yuli Irawan, Indonesian weightlifter
 Gunawan Dwi Cahyo, Indonesian soccer player
 Hendro Kartiko, Indonesian soccer player
 Icuk Sugiarto, former Indonesian badminton player, rated among the world's best in the 1980s
 Ika Yuliana Rochmawati, Indonesian archer player
 Joko Riyadi, Indonesian badminton player
 Virgil Soeroredjo, Surinamese badminton player
 Joko Suprianto, former Indonesian badminton player, rated among the world's best in the 1990s
 Kurniawan Dwi Yulianto, Indonesian soccer player
 Leroy Resodihardjo, Dutch professional footballer
 Lilies Handayani, Indonesian archer player
 Maarten Atmodikoro, Dutch/Surinamese footballer
 Dylan Darmohoetomo, Surinamese badminton player
 Mahali Jasuli, Malaysian footballer
 Maria Kristin Yulianti, Indonesian badminton player, Olympic bronze medalist
 Mohd Amri Yahyah, Malaysian footballer 
 Mohd Safee Mohd Sali, Malaysian footballer
 Moreno Soeprapto, Indonesian race car driver
 Nova Widianto, Indonesian badminton player
Pratama Arhan, Indonesian footballer
 Ranomi Kromowidjojo, Dutch swimmer
Rian Ardianto, Indonesian badminton player
 Rina Dewi Puspitasari, Indonesian archer
 Rina Dewi Puspitasari, Indonesian archer player
 Serginho van Dijk, Indonesian soccer player
Shesar Rhustavito, Indonesian badminton player
 Sigit Budiarto, Indonesian badminton athlete
 Sigourney Bandjar, Surinamese-born Dutch footballer
 Sony Dwi Kuncoro, Indonesian badminton player, Olympic bronze medalist
 Sri Indriyani, Indonesian weightlifter
 Sugiantoro, Indonesian soccer player
 Suryo Agung Wibowo, Indonesian sprinter
 Triyatno, Indonesian weightlifter
 Utut Adianto, Indonesian chess Grandmaster
 Wahyu Wijiastanto, Indonesian soccer player
 Widodo C Putro, Indonesian soccer player
 Winarni Binti Slamet, Indonesian weightlifter
 Yayuk Basuki, Indonesian tennis athlete
 Yongki Aribowo, Indonesian soccer player
 Neraysho Kasanwirjo

Others 
 Agni Pratistha, Indonesia's representative at the Miss Universe 2007 pageant
 Emha Ainun Nadjib, An expert of deconstruction of value understanding, communication patterns, methods of cultural relationships, education of ways of thinking, and the pursuit of solutions to community problems.
 Maya Soetoro-Ng, Barack Obama's half-sister (also of German descent)
 Nadine Chandrawinata, Indonesia's representative at the Miss Universe 2006 pageant (also of German and Chinese descent)
 Pangeran Diponegoro, Javanese prince who opposed Dutch colonial rule
 Putri Raemawasti, Indonesia's representative at the Miss Universe 2008 pageant
 Siti Hartinah, wife of former Indonesian President Suharto, first lady of Indonesia
 Mak Erot, who lived to be over 100 and was noted for penis-extension techniques

See also 
 List of Indonesians
 Overseas Indonesians
 Indonesian Malaysians
 Javanese diaspora
 Javanese Malaysians
 Javanese Surinamese
 Javanese New Caledonians
 Javanese Sri Lankans
 Javanese Singaporeans
 List of Acehnese people
 List of Batak people
 List of Bugis people
 List of Chinese Indonesians
 List of Minangkabaus
 List of Moluccan people
 List of Sundanese people

References

Javanese
Javanese